Territory of Poland may refer to:
The geography of Poland
The territorial evolution of Poland